Amherst College Press, founded in 2014, is a new university press (NUP) sponsored by Amherst College, Massachusetts that specializes in open-access monographs. Initially organized by members of the Amherst College Library, the press issues books via the Fulcrum publishing platform. The press, which is currently an affiliate of the Association of University Presses, publishes all of its digital work through platinum open access licenses.

Amherst College Press, in partnership with Michigan Publishing and the Oberlin Group of Libraries, helped launch Lever Press in 2016.

Publications

Book series
Notable book and monograph series published by Amherst College Press include the following:
 "Public Works: Insights from the Humanities on Issues in the Public Square"
 "Studies in Ethnomusicology"

See also

 List of English-language book publishing companies
 List of university presses
 Michigan Publishing

References

External links 
Amherst College Press

2014 establishments in Massachusetts
Amherst College
Publishing companies established in 2014
Amherst College Press